Astro On Demand (Simplified as Astro AOD) is a Cantonese-language drama TV channel service co-established by TVB and Astro. It features the latest TVB drama series and broadcasts the same time as the origin channel.

The channel was officially launched on 16 July 2007. Astro On Demand plays spontaneously as Hong Kong does on premiering drama series. However, not all drama series are subject to the rules above. Programming options like subtitles are available in Chinese and Malay and in recent years English subtitles and Mandarin audio option are added.

Starting in mid-2018 Astro AOD is now available with additional Chinese subtitles.

Programming schedule
Astro On Demand adopts NVOD so that audiences can review the dramas when they missed the first broadcasting time. For example, all the episodes of a drama premiere on 8.30 are collected at Channel 903–910; those premiere on 9.30 are collected at Channel 923–943. Each channel can collect 4 episodes at most (5–6 episodes in one channel sometimes), that is, the time audiences have to wait at the shortest is 45 minutes, the longest 3 hours (sometimes longer). Furthermore, Astro On Demand keeps the dramas for another week after the entire series ended for audiences who missed them can have a watch. However, if one drama was well received, the channel will keep it longer. So far dramas that have been kept for a month are: Moonlight Resonance, Rosy Business, Beyond the Realm of Conscience, and Born Rich.

List Of TVB Dramas

8.30 pm

9.30 pm

10.30 pm

Programming schedule table

External links 
 Astro On Demand's official website

Video on demand
Television channels and stations established in 2007
Astro Malaysia Holdings television channels